Following is a list of United States federal courthouses, which will comprise all courthouses currently or formerly in use for the housing of United States federal courts. Each entry indicates the name of the building along with an image, if available, its location and the jurisdiction it covers, the dates during which it was used for each such jurisdiction, and, if applicable the person for whom it was named, and the date of renaming. Dates of use will not necessarily correspond with the dates of construction or demolition of a building, as pre-existing structures may be adapted or court use, and former court buildings may later be put to other uses. Also, the official name of the building may be changed at some point after its use as a federal court building has been initiated.

The list contains approximately 687 courthouses.

Alabama

Alaska

Arizona

Arkansas

California

Colorado

Connecticut

Delaware

District of Columbia

Florida

Georgia

Hawaii

Idaho

Illinois

Indiana

Iowa

Kansas

Kentucky

Louisiana

Maine

Maryland

Massachusetts

Michigan

Minnesota

Mississippi

Missouri

Montana

Nebraska

Nevada

New Hampshire

New Jersey

New Mexico

New York

North Carolina

North Dakota

Ohio

Oklahoma

Oregon

Pennsylvania

Rhode Island

South Carolina

South Dakota

Tennessee

Texas

Utah

Vermont

Virginia

Washington

West Virginia

Wisconsin

Wyoming

United States territories

Guam

Northern Mariana Islands

Puerto Rico

Virgin Islands

Key

See also
List of United States district and territorial courts
Federal buildings in the United States

References

External links

United States Courts court locator
Historic Federal Courthouses, photographic directory maintained by the Federal Judicial Center
Find a Building: Search, database of historic government buildings maintained by the General Services Administration
GSA Regions, including directories of government buildings by region, maintained by the General Services Administration

 01
 01
Federal courthouses